The Grind is a 2012 crime drama film written and directed by Rishi Opel, and starring Jamie Foreman, Freddie Connor, Gordon Alexander, Zoe Tapper, Danny John-Jules and Kellie Shirley.

The film tells the story of Vince, a nightclub manager of The Grind in Hackney, East London. Vince, having fought his way to a decent living and respectable lifestyle, is determined to settle down and take life easier. Bobby, Vince's best friend from school, is released from prison and their friendship soon falls apart. Bobby's addiction to cocaine and gambling spirals out of control and he now owes a huge amount of money to Vince's boss, Dave, owner of The Grind and an East End loan shark. Vince's life takes a dramatic turn for the worse.

The Grind features a cast including Jamie Foreman (Layer Cake, Nil By Mouth, Oliver Twist, Doctor Who, Eastenders), Danny John-Jules (Death in Paradise, Red Dwarf, Lock Stock and Two Smoking Barrels), Zoe Tapper (Survivors, Desperate Romantics) and Kellie Shirley (Eastenders, The Office). Also appearing in cameo roles are Dynamo (the street magician whose latest series ‘Dynamo: Magician Impossible’ on Watch has been a huge success) and Sway (MOBO award-winning British grime artist).

Cast
Jamie Foreman as Dave Foreman
Danny John-Jules as Phil
Zoe Tapper as Nancy
Gordon Alexander as Bobby Alexander
Freddie Connor as Vince
Kellie Shirley as Jo
Joseph Morgan as Paul
Jonathan Hansler as Comedian
Ashley McGuire as Linda
Barber Ali as Big Guy
Duncan Clyde as Tony Dixy
Sway DaSafo as Dave's Enforcer
Sheraiah Larcher as Bassy
Steve Frayne (Dynamo) as Street Hustler

References

External links
 
 

2012 films
British crime drama films
British independent films
2012 crime drama films
2012 independent films
2010s English-language films
2010s British films